Thy Womb is a 2012 Filipino drama film starring Nora Aunor, Bembol Roco, Mercedes Cabral, and Lovi Poe. Produced by Center Stage Productions and the Film Development Council of the Philippines (FDCP), Melvin Mangada and Jaime Santiago, the film was written by Henry Burgos and directed by Brillante Mendoza. The film was one of the eight official entries to the 2012 Metro Manila Film Festival.

The film competed for the Golden Lion at the 69th Venice International Film Festival. Although it did not bag the top honors, Thy Womb was awarded three special prizes by other Italian film groups — La Navicella Venezia Cinema Award, the P. Nazareno Taddei Award - Special Mention, and the Bisato d' Oro Award for Best Actress (for Nora Aunor) given by an independent Italian critics group called Premio Della Critica Indipendiente. The film was also invited to the 37th Toronto International Film Festival and the 17th Busan International Film Festival.

The film was referred to as "The Philippines' principal trophy" in Encyclopædia Britannicas section discussing the previous year's films in the Britannica Book of the Year 2013.

Synopsis
Thy Womb is about a Tausug woman who is the midwife of their village. Many childbirths were done by her, ironically, she does not have any children.

Cast

Nora Aunor as Shaleha
Bembol Roco as Bangas-An
Lovi Poe as Mersila
Mercedes Cabral as Aisha

Citations and awards

International awards and recognition

Philippine awards

References

External links

2012 films
2010s Tagalog-language films
Philippine drama films
2010s pregnancy films
Films directed by Brillante Mendoza
Philippine New Wave
2012 drama films
Philippine pregnancy films